Beloozyorsk is a rural locality (a selo) in Dzhidinsky District, Republic of Buryatia, Russia. The population was 1,011 as of 2010. There are 34 streets.

Geography 
Beloozyorsk is located 30 km east of Petropavlovka (the district's administrative centre) by road. Nyuguy is the nearest rural locality.

References 

Rural localities in Dzhidinsky District